Bayou Talla may refer to:

Bayou Talla (Jourdan River tributary), a stream in Mississippi
Bayou Talla (Old Fort Bayou tributary), a stream in Mississippi